Adam Burgess (born 17 July 1992) is a British slalom canoeist who has competed at the international level since 2008.

He won four medals at the ICF Canoe Slalom World Championships with a silver (C1 team: 2017) and three bronzes (C1 team: 2018, C2 team: 2013, 2015). He also won four medals at the European Championships (1 gold, 1 silver and 2 bronzes). He is the 2015 U23 World Champion in C1.

His partner in the C2 boat from 2010 to 2015 was Greg Pitt.

He represented Great Britain at the 2020 Summer Olympics in the C1 event, finishing in 4th place just 0.16 seconds off bronze.

Results

World Cup individual podiums

Complete World Cup results

* Season still in progress.

References

External links

1992 births
English male canoeists
Living people
Sportspeople from Stoke-on-Trent
Medalists at the ICF Canoe Slalom World Championships
Canoeists at the 2020 Summer Olympics
Olympic canoeists of Great Britain